John Michael Candrea (born August 29, 1955) is the former head softball coach at the University of Arizona in Tucson, Arizona.  He was the head coach of the United States women's national softball team in 2004, when Team USA won a gold medal, and in 2008, bringing home silver. At the time of his retirement in 2021, Candrea was the all-time winningest coach in college softball history, and ranked fourth of any coach in any NCAA sport with 1,674 wins.

Education and career beginnings
Born in New Orleans, Candrea moved with his family to Phoenix at age seven. He graduated from Sunnyslope High School and later earned an associate degree at Central Arizona College in 1975, a bachelor's degree at Arizona State University in 1978, and a master's degree from Arizona State in 1980.

Candrea was an assistant baseball coach at Central Arizona from 1976 to 1980 and a softball coach from 1981 through 1985.

University of Arizona
Under Candrea, the Arizona softball team has become one of the top programs in the United States and a perennial powerhouse in the NCAA.  Candrea has coached at Arizona since 1986, where he has garnered 1610 NCAA wins, along with eleven Pac-10 Conference titles. Candrea also has ten Pac-10 coach of the year awards.  The Arizona softball team has won eight Women's College World Series titles, in 1991, 1993, 1994, 1996, 1997, 2001, 2006, and 2007, all under Candrea. The team appeared in the NCAA Women's College World Series 16 consecutive years, from 1988 to 2003, and again from 2005 to 2010—22 appearances, all coming in the last 23 seasons.  In addition, UA has appeared in 12 WCWS title games, including eight consecutive appearances, from 1991 and 1998. UA has most recently appeared in the 2001, 2002, 2006, 2007 and 2010 WCWS games.  Under Candrea at UA, the number of WCWS appearances is second only to UCLA.

On March 26 he became the second coach in NCAA division 1 with 1,500 wins the fastest to ever do so.  On March 5, 2019, Candrea won his 1,580th game tying him with Carol Hutchins of Michigan for most in NCAA Softball history.  Later during the 2019 season, on April 19, Candrea defeated Stanford 9−1 to become only the second coach in NCAA softball history to reach the 1,600 win plateau, and the fastest coach to reach the milestone. 

On June 7, 2021, the University of Arizona announced that Candrea would be retiring after 36 seasons as head coach. The next day Candrea officially announced his retirement at a farewell news conference in McKale Center. He finished his career as the winningest coach in collegiate softball history with 1,674 wins and fourth most of any coach in any NCAA sport. During his career he led the Wildcats to eight national championships, 24 appearances in the Women's College World Series, 34 postseason berths, and 10 conference championships.

Head coaching record
The following lists Candrea's record as a head coach at the NCAA level.

Team USA

Team USA won its third consecutive gold medal at the Athens Olympic Games. In addition, Candrea led the national team to two consecutive World Cup championships, most recently in 2007.

Personal life
Candrea was married to Sue Ellen Hudson for 28 years until her tragic death in July 2004, 10 days before the Olympic Games. Candrea has two children from this marriage, Mikel and Michelle.

In 2005, Candrea welcomed his first grandchild from his daughter Michelle. 

In 2006, Candrea married the former Tina Tilton. He gained two stepsons from his marriage with Tilton.

See also
 List of college softball coaches with 1,000 wins

References

External links
 
 Arizona profile

1955 births
Living people
American Olympic coaches
Softball coaches from Arizona
American softball coaches
Arizona Wildcats softball coaches
Central Arizona Vaqueros baseball coaches
Arizona State University alumni
Central Arizona Vaqueros baseball players
Sportspeople from New Orleans
Sportspeople from the Phoenix metropolitan area
People from Casa Grande, Arizona
Central Arizona Vaqueros softball coaches
United States women's national softball team coaches